Brass Wire Bar is a former settlement in Nevada County, California. Brass Wire Bar is located on the South Yuba River, across from Washington.  It was a mining camp; Chinese miners worked the site in 1880.  About $50,000 dollars worth of gold was found there.

References

Former populated places in California
Former settlements in Nevada County, California